The 2009–10 Welsh Alliance League, known as the design2print Welsh Alliance League for sponsorship reasons, is the 26th season of the Welsh Alliance League, which is in the third level of the Welsh football pyramid.

The league consists of sixteen teams with the champions promoted to the Cymru Alliance and the bottom five relegated to Division 2.

The season began on 15 August 2009 and concluded on 15 May 2010 with Rhydymwyn as champions and promoted to the Cymru Alliance. Blaenau Ffestiniog Amateur, Llandyrnog United, Nantlle Vale, Amlwch Town and Halkyn United were relegated to the newly formed Welsh Alliance League Division 2.

Teams
Bethesda Athletic were champions in the previous season and were promoted to the Cymru Alliance. They were replaced by Gwynedd League champions Blaenau Ffestiniog Amateur and Llandyrnog United who were relegated from the Cymru Alliance.

Grounds and locations

League table

Results

References

External links
 Welsh Alliance League

Welsh Alliance League seasons
3